Assemble or Assembled may refer to:

Assemble (album), 2005 album by Grown at Home
Assemble (collective), collective of people based in London
Marvel Studios: Assembled, American television series of documentary specials

See also

Assembly (disambiguation)
Assembler (disambiguation)
Avengers Assemble (disambiguation)